The Regional Council of Piedmont (Consiglio Regionale del Piemonte) is the legislative assembly of Piedmont.

It was first elected in 1970, when the ordinary regions were instituted, on the basis of the Constitution of Italy of 1948.

Composition
The Regional Council of Piedmont was originally composed of 60 regional councillors. Following the decree-law n. 138 of 13 August 2011, the number of regional councillors was reduced to 50, with an additional seat reserved for the President of the Region.

Political groups
The Regional Council of Piedmont is currently composed of the following political groups:

See also
Regional council
Politics of Piedmont
President of Piedmont

References

External links
Regional Council of Piedmont

Politics of Piedmont
Italian Regional Councils
Piedmont